

Original list
This is a list of Billboard magazine's Top Hot 100 songs of 1963, which appeared in the December 28, 1963 issue of Billboard.

Later list
In later years, Billboard released another list of the top Hot 100 singles of 1963, which included data from the end of the year that had not been included in the compilation of the original list.

See also
1963 in music
List of Billboard Hot 100 number-one singles of 1963
List of Billboard Hot 100 top-ten singles in 1963

References

1963 record charts
Billboard charts